Maurice Ngangtar (1932 – 12 October 2001) was a Chadian politician and diplomat. He was Minister of Foreign Affairs of Chad from 1963 to 1964.

References

1932 births
2001 deaths
Chadian diplomats
Foreign ministers of Chad